Devon Hills is a rural residential locality in the local government area (LGA) of Northern Midlands in the Central LGA region of Tasmania. The 2016 census recorded a population of 433 for the state suburb of Devon Hills.

History 
Devon Hills is a confirmed locality.

Geography
Most of the boundaries are survey lines. The Western Railway Line runs along part of the southern boundary.

Road infrastructure 
National Route 1 (Midland Highway) runs along part of the western boundary.

References

Towns in Tasmania
Localities of Northern Midlands Council